Pedalion may refer to:

 A synonym of the genus Isognomon
 A 19th-century collection of canon law by Nicodemus the Hagiorite